The Dampfzentrale ("steam center") is a cultural centre and former fossil fuel power plant in Bern, Switzerland. The power plant was built between 1901 and 1904 by architect Eduard Joos at Marzilistrasse 47. The chair of the board Nicola von Greyerz stood down in 2018 and was replaced by Melanie Mettler and Vinzenz Mathys. In 2023, it was announced that the Dampfzentrale would receive 2.4 million CHF every year in subsidies from 2024 until 2027.

See also 
 Kulturzentrum Reitschule

References

External links

 Website

Buildings and structures in Bern
Culture in Bern
Music venues in Switzerland
Tourist attractions in Bern